Sheboygan County is a county  in the U.S. state of Wisconsin. It is named after the Sheboygan River. As of the 2020 census, the population was 118,034. Its county seat is Sheboygan. The county was created in 1836 and organized in 1846. At the time, it was located in the Wisconsin Territory. Sheboygan County comprises the Sheboygan, WI Metropolitan Statistical Area. Part of the Holyland region is located in northwestern Sheboygan County.

Geography 

Major highways 
  Interstate 43
  Highway 23 (Wisconsin)
  Highway 28 (Wisconsin)
  Highway 32 (Wisconsin)
  Highway 42 (Wisconsin)
  Highway 57 (Wisconsin)
  Highway 67 (Wisconsin)
  Highway 144 (Wisconsin)

Railroads 
Union Pacific
Wisconsin and Southern Railroad

Buses 
Shoreline Metro
List of intercity bus stops in Wisconsin

Airport 
Sheboygan County Memorial Airport (KSBM), serves the county and surrounding communities.

Adjacent counties 
 Manitowoc County – north
 Ozaukee County – south
 Washington County – southwest
 Fond du Lac County – west
 Calumet County – northwest

Climate

Demographics 

As of the census of 2020, the population was 118,034. The racial makeup of the county was 83.2% White, 5.9% Asian, 2.2% Black or African American, 0.5% Native American, 2.9% from other races, and 5.4% from two or more races. Ethnically, the population was 7.3% Hispanic or Latino of any race.

As of the census of 2000, there were 112,646 people, 43,545 households, and 29,915 families residing in the county. The population density was 219 people per square mile (85/km2). There were 45,947 housing units at an average density of 90 per square mile (35/km2). The racial makeup of the county was 92.71% White, 1.09% Black or African American, 0.36% Native American, 3.28% Asian, 0.02% Pacific Islander, 1.46% from other races, and 1.07% from two or more races.

3.36% of the population were Hispanic or Latino of any race. 54.9% were of German, 7.8% Dutch and 5.4% American ancestry. 91.9% spoke English, 3.0% Spanish, 2.5% Hmong and 1.7% German as their first language.

There were 43,545 households, out of which 32.30% had children under the age of 18 living with them, 58.00% were married couples living together, 7.30% had a female householder with no husband present, and 31.30% were non-families. 26.10% of all households were made up of individuals, and 10.40% had someone living alone who was 65 years of age or older. The average household size was 2.50 and the average family size was 3.05.

In the county, the population was spread out, with 25.50% under the age of 18, 8.40% from 18 to 24, 29.80% from 25 to 44, 22.30% from 45 to 64, and 14.00% who were 65 years of age or older. The median age was 37 years. For every 100 females there were 100.60 males. For every 100 females age 18 and over, there were 99.90 males.

In 2017, there were 1,204 births, giving a general fertility rate of 61.3 births per 1000 women aged 15–44, the 31st lowest rate out of all 72 Wisconsin counties. Additionally, there were 81 reported induced abortions performed on women of Sheboygan County residence in 2017.

Communities

Cities

Villages 

 Adell
 Cascade
 Cedar Grove
 Elkhart Lake
 Glenbeulah
 Howards Grove
 Kohler
 Oostburg
 Random Lake
 Waldo

Towns 

 Greenbush
 Herman
 Holland
 Lima
 Lyndon
 Mitchell
 Mosel
 Plymouth
 Rhine
 Russell
 Scott
 Sheboygan
 Sheboygan Falls
 Sherman
 Wilson

Census-designated places 
 Gibbsville
 Greenbush
 Hingham

Unincorporated communities 

 Ada
 Batavia
 Beechwood
 Cranberry Marsh
 Dacada
 Edwards
 Franklin
 German Corners
 Gooseville
 Haven
 Hayen
 Hulls Crossing
 Idlewood Beach
 Johnsonville
 Mosel
 New Paris
 Ourtown
 Parnell
 Rhine Center
 St. Anna (partial)
 Silver Creek
 Weedens
 Winooski

Ghost towns 
 Kennedys Corners

Public High Schools 

 Elkhart Lake-Glenbeulah High School
 Étude High School
 Howards Grove High School
 Kohler High School
 North High School (Sheboygan)
 Oostburg High School
 Plymouth Comprehensive High School
 Random Lake High School
 Sheboygan Falls High School
 Sheboygan South High School

Law enforcement 

The Sheboygan County Sheriff's Office was established in 1846, with T.C. Horner the first Sheriff elected. The Sheriff's Office was once located inside the David Taylor House, which still stands today in the same location as a part of the Sheboygan County Historical Museum. The jail was located in the basement of the David Taylor House from 1915 to 1936 while the Sheriff's Office was located on the first floor and the Sheriff's residence on the second floor. In 1936, the Sheriff's Office and county jail moved to the top floor of the Sheboygan County Courthouse.

In 1981, the Sheboygan County Sheriff's Office relocated to its present location inside the Law Enforcement Center at 525 North 6th Street in Sheboygan. At the time, it was a very contemporary linear facility with modern security systems. The second floor of the Sheriff's Office served as the county jail until 1998 when a 95,000 square foot, 295 bed Detention Center was constructed on the city's south side. It was envisioned the Sheriff's Office and the Sheboygan Police Department would be housed inside the Law Enforcement Center but that never occurred.

In 2012, after years of discussion, the Sheboygan County and City of Sheboygan approved an agreement to combine emergency dispatch at the Law Enforcement Center. Under the proposal, the city will fund remodeling of the new center by providing $2.5 million for the project. The Joint Dispatch Center began operation in 2016.

The current Sheriff is Cory Roeseler, who was elected to his first term in office in 2018.

Politics

See also 
 National Register of Historic Places listings in Sheboygan County, Wisconsin

References

Further reading 
 Buchen, Gustave W. Historic Sheboygan County. Sheboygan, Wis., 1944.
 Hildebrand, Janice. Sheboygan County, 150 Years of Progress: An Illustrated History. Northridge, Calif: Windsor Publications, 1988.
 Portrait and Biographical Record of Sheboygan County, Wisconsin. Chicago: Excelsior Publishing Company, 1894.
 Zillier, Carl. History of Sheboygan County, Wisconsin: Past and Present. Chicago: S.J. Clarke Publishing Company, 1912.

External links 
 Official website
 Sheboygan County Chamber of Commerce

 
Wisconsin counties
1846 establishments in Wisconsin Territory
Populated places established in 1846